HNLMS Groningen is a  operated by the Royal Netherlands Navy.

The vessel was built in the Romanian shipyards in Galati, by the Dutch firm Damen Group.

Integrated mast module
The integrated mast module (IMM) has been built to an innovative concept. The mast houses all systems which form the "eyes and ears" of the ship. The ship can efficiently detect pirate and smuggling boats while keeping an eye on the skies as well.
For the first time camera, radar and communications antenna systems are merged into one mast structure. This allows the ship to see flying and floating objects. The means of communication in the mast making it possible to carry out worldwide operations in conjunction with aircraft and ships.

Service history

2012
In late 2012 Groningen was exercising with HNLMS Friesland when  sank after a collision with another ship.
Both Holland-class offshore patrol vessels assisted in the search for survivors.

2014
On 28 April, Groningen departed Den Helder for deployment to the Caribbean on counter-drug operations and coast guard duties.
On her way to the Caribbean she completed multiple exercises with six other European navies (MAOC-N).

In early June Groningen received  an overnight notification from the US Coast Guard. A patrol plane saw a boat, a so-called go-fast, heading north at high speed. A US helicopter on board the ship took off immediately. Groningen itself headed to the specified location off the coast of Panama.
When the smugglers heard the helicopter, they jettisoned their cargo. Groningen arrived moments later. The crew managed to retrieve multiple packages of drugs from the water. They recovered about half of the estimated .

The three smugglers were arrested and transferred to the Coast Guard.
She returned home to Vlissingen on 5 September for a short maintenance period.

On 29 December two Russian navy vessels, the destroyer Vice-Admiral Kulakov and a tug from the  sailed along the Dutch coast being escorted by Groningen.

2015
On 9 August Groningen departed Den Helder for a four-month deployment off the coast of Somalia, as part of the EU anti-piracy mission Atalanta.
On 11 December she sailed back into her homeport.

2016
In 2016 Groningen was deployed to the Caribbean on counter-drug operations and coast guard duties.

2018
In December 2018, the Royal Netherlands Navy (RNLN) was reported to be planning to trial a new crewing concept for its Holland-class offshore patrol vessels (OPVs) and selected Groningen for this two-year long pilot project. The main purpose of the project is to provide clarity for crews to know when they are deployed and when they are back home.

2020
On 19 July, the ships NH90 helicopter crashed off the coast of Aruba, killing two crew members and injuring two passengers. The Dutch Ministry of Defence launched an investigation, grounding all of the country's NH90s until more is known.

See also
 HNLMS Holland (P840)
 HNLMS Zeeland (P841)
 HNLMS Friesland (P842)

References

Holland-class offshore patrol vessels
2011 ships
Ships built in Romania
Patrol vessels of the Royal Netherlands Navy